Kohorst is a German surname. Notable people with the surname include:

Madita Kohorst (born 1996), German handball player
W. Robert Kohorst (born 1953), American lawyer, businessman, and diplomat

German-language surnames